The Cave of El Toro is a cave complex located in the El Torcal de Antequera natural reserve near Málaga, Andalusia, Spain. It lies at about 1,190 meters above sea level. The cave has yielded evidence of human occupation as early as the Early Neolithic (5280 BC).

Genetics

 examined the remains of 12 individuals buried at El Toro c. 5280-4750 BC during the Early Neolithic. The 1 sample of Y-DNA extracted belonged to the paternal haplogroup G-M201, while the 7 samples of mtDNA extracted belonged to the maternal haplogroups T2c1d, J2b1a (two samples), T2b3 (two samples), K1a1 and K1a2a. The examined individuals were found to be genetically similar to people of the Cardial Ware culture in the rest of Iberia and other Early European Farmers (EEFs) of Early Neolithic Europe. No evidence of sub-Saharan African admixture was detected. Among modern populations they were found to be most similar to Spaniards, Sardinians and North Italians.

References

Sources

 

Toro
Prehistoric sites in Spain
Archaeological sites in Andalusia